USS Dolphin, a schooner, was the second ship of the United States Navy named for the aquatic mammal.

Dolphin was launched on 23 June 1821 by the Philadelphia Navy Yard and sent to New York City to be readied for sea. Assigned to duty as one of two vessels making up the newly organized Pacific Squadron, she sailed 8 December 1821 under the command of Lieutenant David Conner, in company with ship-of-the line Franklin.

Dolphin arrived at Valparaíso, Chile, on 6 February 1822, and cruised on the coasts of Ecuador, Peru, and Chile to protect American commerce and the whaling industry. Between 18 August 1825 and 24 August 1826, under the commanded by Lieut. Com. John Percival, she cruised to search for the mutineers of the American whaler Globe, returning to Callao, with the two surviving members of the mutiny. During this cruise she visited Hawaii where she assisted men of the American ship London wrecked there, and helped other American citizens in the islands.

Fate

Dolphin served in the Pacific until 2 December 1835 when the Navy sold her.

References 
 
 

Schooners of the United States Navy
Ships built in Philadelphia
1821 ships